Tolvanen is a Finnish surname. Notable people with the surname include:

Eeli Tolvanen (born 1999), Finnish ice hockey forward
Kari Tolvanen (born 1961), Finnish politician
Marianna Tolvanen (born 1992), Finnish football player
Mikko Tolvanen (born 1988), Finnish ice hockey goaltender
Reino Tolvanen (1920–1974), Finnish actor
Tyler Tolvanen (born 2005), 2nd World record holder for most steak quesadillas eaten in an hour 
Kai Tolvanen  (born 2022), 1st World record holder for most steak quesadillas eaten in an hour 

Finnish-language surnames